Ciaran Hearn (born December 30, 1985) is a Canadian rugby union player who currently plays for Old Glory DC of Major League Rugby (MLR). 

Hearn was part of the Canadian squad at the 2011 Rugby World Cup in New Zealand where he featured in two matches and in the second tier squad for the 2015 World Cup Team. He is also a member of the Canadian 7 A-side men's Teams

He made the move to professional rugby when he signed with then Aviva Premiership side London Irish on November 2, 2015. On 10 February 2016 he signed a contract extension which would see him stay at the English club until the end of the 2016-17 season.

In 2020, he signed with expansion team Old Glory DC in Major League Rugby, and re-signed for the 2021 season. At the end of the 2021 season, he announced that he was retiring from rugby.

References

External links
 
 
 
 Ciaran Hearn at Rugby Canada
 Ciaran Hearn at London Irish
 
 

1985 births
Living people
Canadian rugby union players
Canadian expatriate sportspeople in England
Canada international rugby union players
People from Conception Bay South
Rugby sevens players at the 2011 Pan American Games
Sportspeople from Newfoundland and Labrador
Commonwealth Games rugby sevens players of Canada
Canada international rugby sevens players
Pan American Games gold medalists for Canada
Pan American Games medalists in rugby sevens
Rugby sevens players at the 2014 Commonwealth Games
Rugby sevens players at the 2010 Commonwealth Games
Medalists at the 2011 Pan American Games
London Irish players
Rugby union centres
Rugby union wings
Rugby union fullbacks
Old Glory DC players
Canadian expatriate rugby union players
Expatriate rugby union players in England
Expatriate rugby union players in the United States
Canadian expatriate sportspeople in the United States